Volot may refer to:
Volot (rural locality), name of several rural localities in Russia
A giant in Slavic mythology